Resavica River may refer to:
Resavčina or Resavica River, a river in Serbia, a 32 km-long right tributary to the Velika Morava river
Resavica River (Resava), a tributary of the Resava (river) in Serbia